U-232 may refer to:

, a German Type VIIC submarine used in World War II
 Uranium-232 (U-232 or 232U), an isotope of uranium